JJP may refer to:

People
 Jacobus Johannes Pieter Oud or J. J. P. Oud (1890–1963), a Dutch architect
 John Jewell Penstone or JJP (1817–1902), English painter and engraver

Other uses
 Jannayak Janta Party, a political party in Haryana, India
 Jetstar Japan, a low-fare Japanese airline
 Joondalup railway station, in Australia

.